Demokratische Zeitung was a daily newspaper published from Berlin between 1 October 1871 and 31 March 1872. The paper was founded by Johann Jacoby and had a democratic and republican orientation. The newspaper was edited by J. Voigt, K. Hirsch and C. Lübeck. Prominent contributors included Temme, M. Friedlander, C. Lübeck, W. Spindler and G. Spauer.

References

1871 establishments in Germany
1872 disestablishments in Germany
Daily newspapers published in Germany
Defunct newspapers published in Germany
German-language newspapers
Newspapers published in Berlin
Publications established in 1871
Publications disestablished in 1872